Sara Oust (1778–1822) was a Norwegian lay minister and follower of Hans Nielsen Hauge. She was one of the first female religious leaders within the Haugean movement.

Biography
Sara Oust was born at the village of Vingelen in the parish of Tolga in Hedmark, Norway. She was the daughter of Engebret Engebretsen Vingelen and Mari Persdatter Røe. Being fatherless at the age of seven, Sara Oust helped her mother carry coal at the Røros Copper Works (Røros kopparverk).

She first became aware of the teachings of Hans Nielsen Hauge in 1799. She subsequently preached in Trøndelag between 1799 and 1805 alongside another female lay minister, Randi Hevle from Drivdalen in Sør-Trøndelag, and later Kirsten Fossen from Kvikne. She reportedly had a beautiful singing voice and she also wrote psalms.  Under the Conventicle Act of 1741, Norwegian citizens at the time did not have the right to religious assembly without a Church of Norway minister present. She successfully defended a collective of Haugeans from the local authorities, who gave up their attempts to implement the law after having seen she had too much support from the community. She first met Hans Nielsen Hauge in Oppdal during 1803.

In 1805, Sara Oust married Ola Toresen Røe (1776–1862), who was a farmer in Vingelen. Although following the death of Hans Nielsen Hauge in 1824, the Haugean Movement became less supportive of lay ministers.

References

Primary Source
Bakken, Arne O. (1973) Haugianerne i Nord-Østerdal de første årene lederen Sara Oust 1778-1822 (Oslo: Tolga bibliotek)

External links
Sara Oust-spel 2012

Related Reading
Aarflot, Andreas (1979) Hans Nielsen Hauge, his life and message (Minneapolis: Augsburg Publishing) 
Furseth, Inger  (2002) A Comparative Study of Social and Religious Movements in Norway, 1780s-1905 (New York City: Edwin Mellen Press) 
Pettersen, Wilhelm (2008) The Light In The Prison Window: The Life Story of Hans Nielsen Hauge (Kessinger Publishing, LLC) 
Shaw, Joseph M. (1979) Pulpit Under the Sky: A Life of Hans Nielsen Hauge (Greenwood Press Reprint) 

1778 births
1822 deaths
19th-century Norwegian people
19th-century religious leaders
Norwegian Christian religious leaders
Women Christian clergy
19th-century Norwegian women